Yevgeny Yuryevich Alyoshin (born 4 May 1979 Nizhny Novgorod) is a former Russian swimmer who specialized in backstroke. He competed at the 2004 Olympics and the 2007 World Championships.

In November 2010, Aleshin was banned for two years for violation of FINA DC Rule 2.4 (failure to file required whereabouts information and missed tests).  He subsequently retired.

References

1979 births
Russian male swimmers
Male backstroke swimmers
Swimmers at the 2004 Summer Olympics
Olympic swimmers of Russia
Living people
Medalists at the FINA World Swimming Championships (25 m)
European Aquatics Championships medalists in swimming
Doping cases in swimming
Sportspeople from Nizhny Novgorod
20th-century Russian people
21st-century Russian people